is a former Japanese football player.

Playing career
Matsumoto was born in Mie Prefecture on June 17, 1969. After graduating from high school, he joined Japan Soccer League club Mitsubishi Motors (later Urawa Reds) in 1988. In 1992, Japan Soccer League was folded and founded new league J1 League. He played several matches in J1 League. However he could not play many matches and retired end of 1993 season.

Club statistics

References

External links

reds.uijin.com
ocn.ne.jp

1969 births
Living people
Japanese footballers
Japan Soccer League players
J1 League players
Urawa Red Diamonds players
Association football midfielders